

The Caudron C.480 Frégate was a French three-seat touring monoplane designed by Maurice Devlieger and built by Société des avions Caudron.

Development
Based on the earlier Caudron C.280 the Frégate was a high-wing braced monoplane with an enclosed cabin for the pilot with two side-by-seats behind for passengers. Powered by a front-mounted 140 hp (104 kW) Renault 4Pei inline piston engine it had a tailwheel landing gear. The company built 27 Frégates, in 1939, 20 were requisitioned into service with the French Air Force for liaison work.

Operators

French Air Force

Specifications

See also

References
Notes

Bibliography

1930s French civil utility aircraft
C.480
High-wing aircraft
Single-engined tractor aircraft
Aircraft first flown in 1935